was a town located in Izumi District, Kagoshima Prefecture, Japan.

As of 2003, the town had an estimated population of 13,965 and the density of 196.28 persons per km². The total area was 71.15 km².

On March 13, 2006, Takaono, along with the town of Noda (also from Izumi District), was merged into the expanded city of Izumi and no longer exists as an independent municipality.

External links
 Official website of Izumi  (some content in English)

Dissolved municipalities of Kagoshima Prefecture